Sese Bau (born 23 June 1992) is a Papua New Guinean cricketer. He made his List A debut in the 2015–17 ICC World Cricket League Championship on 24 June 2015 against the Netherlands. He made his first-class debut in the 2015–17 ICC Intercontinental Cup on 21 November 2015 against Afghanistan. 

Bau made his Twenty20 International debut on 6 February 2016 against Ireland in Australia. He made his One Day International debut on 4 November 2016 against Hong Kong.

In August 2018, he was named in Papua New Guinea's squad for Group A of the 2018–19 ICC World Twenty20 East Asia-Pacific Qualifier tournament. In March 2019, he was named in Papua New Guinea's squad for the Regional Finals of the 2018–19 ICC World Twenty20 East Asia-Pacific Qualifier tournament. The following month, he was named in Papua New Guinea's squad for the 2019 ICC World Cricket League Division Two tournament in Namibia. He was the leading run-scorer for Papua New Guinea in the tournament, with 141 runs in six matches.

In June 2019, he was selected to represent the Papua New Guinea cricket team in the men's tournament at the 2019 Pacific Games. In September 2019, he was named in Papua New Guinea's squad for the 2019 ICC T20 World Cup Qualifier tournament in the United Arab Emirates. In August 2021, Bau was named in Papua New Guinea's squad for the 2021 ICC Men's T20 World Cup.

References

External links
 

1992 births
Living people
Papua New Guinean cricketers
Papua New Guinea One Day International cricketers
Papua New Guinea Twenty20 International cricketers
Place of birth missing (living people)